Amlwch Urban District Council (UDC), Anglesey, was established in 1894 under the provisions of the Local Government Act 1894 and abolished in 1974.

External links
 Some information about the district

Urban districts of Wales
History of Anglesey